Bangladesh Submarine Cable Company Limited (BSCCL) is a fiber optic submarine cable telecommunications company  and telecommunications service provider (IIG and ISP) based in Bangladesh. Emerging in July 2008 BSCCL presently handles Bangladesh's two submarine cables as a member of the SEA-ME-WE 4  and SEA-ME-WE 5  international submarine cable consortiums.  SEA-ME-WE4 cable runs a total length of 18,800 km through 17 landing points in Singapore, Malaysia, Thailand, Bangladesh, India, Sri Lanka, Pakistan, United Arab Emirates, Saudi Arabia, Egypt, Tunisia, Italy, Algeria and France.

It is also a party of the new submarine cable under the SEA-ME-WE-5 consortium and the company's new station has been built in Kuakata, Patuakhali. Its main office is located at Dhaka.

Presently, BSCCL is providing submarine cable bandwidth for different routes and different capacities to the International Internet Gateway (IIG) and large corporate clients in Bangladesh. It has also got the license for IIG and ISP operations in Bangladesh.

References

External links
BSCCL website

Telecommunications companies of Bangladesh
2008 establishments in Bangladesh
Government-owned companies of Bangladesh